Petra Kuppers (born 1968) is a community performance artist and a disability culture activist. She is a professor of English, Women's and Gender Studies, Theater and Dance, and Art and Design, teaching mainly in Performance Studies and Disability Studies, at the University of Michigan, Ann Arbor, and she serves on the faculty of Goddard College's MFA program in Interdisciplinary Arts. Her book Gut Botany (Wayne State University Press, 2020) was named one of New York Public Library's "Best Books of 2020."

Early life and education
Petra Kuppers was born April 1, 1968, in a small town in northern-western Germany. She left Germany when she was 24 and then spent 10 years in Wales, where she learned about disability culture before moving to the United States.

She was the first in her immediate family to go to university. She went on to gain an MA in Film Studies from the University of Warwick; an MA in Germanistik, Cultural Anthropology, Theatre, Film and TV Studies from the University of Cologne; and a PhD in Performance Studies and Feminist Theory from the Falmouth College of Art. She also has a Diploma in Health and Social Welfare Studies from the Open University in the UK.

Career
Kuppers is the artistic director of The Olimpias: Performance Research Projects, an artists' collective that creates collaborative, exploratory environments for people with physical, emotional, sensory and cognitive differences to interact with their allies. Her book about how The Olimpias conducts research through artistic practices, "Disability Culture and Community Performance: Find a Strange and Twisted Shape," won the biennial Sally Banes Award from the American Association for Theatre Research. Kuppers is also the recipient of the President's Award for Art and Activism, Women Caucus for the Arts, awarded at the College ArtAssociation's National Meeting in New York City, 2015

Work
Kuppers is widely published in journals that explore issues how disability engages with culture and the arts such as TDR: The Drama Review, About Performance, Liminalities, Afterimage, the Quarterly Review of Film and Video, and differences. Her books include Disability and Contemporary Performance: Bodies on Edge (2003), The Scar of Visibility: Medical Performances and Contemporary Art (2007), Community Performance: An Introduction (2007), "Disability Culture and Community Performance: Find a Strange and Twisted Shape"(2013), and Studying Disability Arts and Culture (2014). She also co-authored the poetry collection Cripple Poetics: A Love Story (2008) with fellow disability culture activist Neil Marcus. Her latest book is Studying Disability Arts and Culture: An Introduction (Palgrave, October 2014).

References

External links
 Petra Kuppers, C.V
 The Olimpias: Performance Research Projects

1968 births
Living people
German performance artists
German disability rights activists
University of Michigan faculty
Alumni of the University of Warwick
University of Cologne alumni
Alumni of Falmouth University